Budnikowsky (Budni in short) is a German drugstore chain based in Hamburg. It is Germany's fourth largest drugstore retailer after dm-drogerie markt, Rossmann, and Müller.

The company's first store was established by Ivan Budnikowsky in 1912, in Harburg, Hamburg. Today, the company operates over 170 stores, most of which are based in the Hamburg Metropolitan Region. In 2019, it collaborated with the supermarket chain Edeka.

References

External links 

 Official website

Retail companies established in 1912
German brands
Pharmacies of Germany
Companies based in Hamburg